Dreamcatcher is a studio album by Ian Gillan, released in September 1997 in Japan, October 1997 in the United Kingdom and in May 1998 in the US. All songs were performed by Ian Gillan accompanied by Steve Morris. The album was being worked on between 1995 and 1997.

There are three different versions of the album. The basic European edition consists of twelve tracks. The US edition was remixed by Bob Katz, the order of the songs was changed and it has a different cover. The Japanese edition includes of two extra tracks.

Dreamcatcher is considered the most obscure album in Gillan's career. It features mostly acoustic songs, closer to folk and blues traditions than to rock, the genre for which Gillan is mainly known. It received little media attention and generally had rather disappointing reviews.

Track listings

US edition
 "Hard on You" – 4:45
 "You Sold My Love for a Song" – 4:04
 "Sugar Plum" – 4:54
 "A Day Late and a Dollar Short" – 4:26
 "Chandra's Coriander" – 5:24
 "All in My Mind" – 4:15
 "Prima Donna" – 3:59
 "Sleepy Warm" – 3:56
 "Country Mile" – 3:47
 "That's Why God Is Singing the Blues" – 3:33
 "Gunga Din" – 2:50
 "Anyway You Want Me" – 3:42

Personnel
 Ian Gillan – vocals, guitars
 Steve Morris – various instruments

Production notes
 Produced by Ian Gillan and Steve Morris
 Mixed by Ken Nelson at Parr St. Studios, Liverpool
 Recorded at Ocean Reach Studio, Warrington, and Parr St. Studios, Liverpool
 US version remixed and mastered by Bob Katz at Digital Domain, Longwood, Florida

References

1997 albums
Ian Gillan albums